Dragan Šutanovac (born 24 July 1968) is a Serbian politician, former leader of the Democratic Party and former Minister of Defence in the Government of Serbia.

He supports the accession of Serbia to the European Union and NATO.

Background 
He graduated from the University of Belgrade Faculty of Mechanical Engineering. He specialized in security courses in the field of law enforcement and gained a diploma for security issues and oversight. He is also holder of the diploma of George C. Marshall European Center for Security Studies in Garmisch-Partenkirchen. From April to May 2000, he served in the European Parliament in Strasbourg and Brussels. In September 2000, he was appointed special advisor at the Federal Ministry of Interior and in 2001 he became Assistant Federal Minister of Interior. In parliamentary elections in 2000, 2003 and 2007 he was selected as an MP.

From 2002 to 2003 he was president of the Serbian Parliament's committee for defense and security. In local elections in 2000 and 2004, he was voted deputy in the Belgrade City Assembly.

References

External links 
Biography at Ministry of Defence
 

|-

1968 births
Living people
Politicians from Belgrade
Government ministers of Serbia
Democratic Party (Serbia) politicians
University of Belgrade Faculty of Mechanical Engineering alumni
Defence ministers of Serbia